The Gentry Apartments, also known as Zahn Apartments, is a historic apartment building located at Joplin, Jasper County, Missouri.  It was built in 1918, and is a six-story, "U"-shaped, buff brick building.  It measures approximately 45 feet by 120 feet and retains its original open storefront with large display windows and transoms. 

It was listed on the National Register of Historic Places in 2006.

References

Residential buildings on the National Register of Historic Places in Missouri
Residential buildings completed in 1918
Buildings and structures in Joplin, Missouri
National Register of Historic Places in Jasper County, Missouri